The Polynesian island of Raiatea, in the Society Islands, was a kingdom from the 18th century until its annexation by France in 1888. After Tamatoa VI's abdication, a rebel government was set up by chief Teraupo'o with Queen Tuarii as its figurehead until French colonial forces ended the native resistance and exiled the leaders in 1897. The island is now a part of French Polynesia.

Monarchs of Raiatea

See also
 List of monarchs of Tahiti
 List of monarchs of Huahine
 List of monarchs of Bora Bora
 List of colonial and departmental heads of French Polynesia
 President of French Polynesia

Notes

References

Raiatea
 
French Polynesian royalty
People from Raiatea